The Earth Strikes Back is a short story collection edited by Richard Chizmar published by White Wolf in 1994.

Plot summary
The Earth Strikes Back is a compilation of 20 ecological horror stories specially written for this publication.

Contents
 "My Copsa Micas", by Dan Simmons
 "Harvest", by Norman Partridge
 "Toxic Wastrels", by Poppy Z. Brite
 "The Forest Is Crying", by Charles De Lint
 "I Remember Me", by Thomas Tessier
 "Ground Water", by James Kisner
 "Cages", by Ed Gorman
 "Where It's Safe", by John Shirley
 "Expiration Date", by William Relling Jr.
 "The Dreaded Hobblobs", by Gary A. Braunbeck
 "Cancer Alley", by Nancy A. Collins
 "Binary", by Roman A. Ranieri
 "Tyrophex-Fourteen", by Ronald Kelly
 "Torrent", by Mark Rainey
 "Toxic Shock", by Rick Hautala
 "Please Stand By", by Thomas F. Monteleone
 "Double-Edged Sword", by Barry Hoffman
 "The Fur Coat", by Richard Laymon
 "Do Not Pass Go Do Not Collect $200", by Chelsea Quinn Yarbro
 "Genesis II", by Hugh B. Cave

Reception
Andy Butcher reviewed The Earth Strikes Back for Arcane magazine, rating it a 9 out of 10 overall. Butcher comments that "it's well worth the effort to track down, and very highly recommended" and called it "a superb work".

Reviews
Review by Peter Crowther (1995) in Interzone, #101 November 1995
Review by Eric M. Eskenazi (1996) in Fangoria, May 1996
Review by Don D'Ammassa (1996) in Science Fiction Chronicle, #190 October 1996

References

1994 short story collections